Ekmanianthe is a genus of flowering plants in the family Bignoniaceae. It is most closely related to Tabebuia and has sometimes been included within it. It consists of two species of trees, neither of which is especially common in any part of its range:
It is considered Endangered by the IUCN Red List.
"Roble" is a Spanish name that is also applied to Tabebuia. Neither of the species of Ekmanianthe is known in cultivation. The type species for Ekmanianthe is E. longiflora. 

The wood of Ekmanianthe has been variously described as "soft" or as "very hard, heavy, and strong". Despite this, like many other Tecomeae species, it is rarely cultivated.

Description
The following description is based on two sources.

 Leaves opposite, long-petiolate, palmately compound; usually 5-foliate.
 Inflorescence terminal, few-flowered, racemose or narrowly paniculate.
 Calyx cupular, 5-parted, caducous.
 Corolla nearly actinomorphic.
 Corolla tube unlike that of most of Bignoniaceae in that it is not differentiated into two unlike parts, one above and one below the level of stamen insertion.
 Corolla lobes indistinct, deeply laciniate (irregularly cut into slender segments).
 Stamens 4 or 5, exserted or subexserted.
 Ovary linear, with ovules in 2 series.
 Fruit a linear capsule, slightly curved, subterete, with prominent, longitudinal ridges.
 Seeds thin, bialate (with 2 wings).

Ekmanianthe actinophylla is chiropterophilous (bat-pollinated). E. longiflora has the long, narrow corolla tube that is typical of hawkmoth-pollinated flowers.

The basally curved fruit of Ekmanianthe is a distinguishing feature, clearly separating that genus from Tabebuia. The edge of the corolla is laciniate in a few moth-pollinated and a few bat-pollinated species of Tabebuia, but much less so than in Ekmanianthe. The lenticels of E. longiflora and the costae (ribs) on the fruit of E. actinophylla are more prominent than those of any species of Tabebuia. The corolla tube of E. longiflora is longer than that of any species of Tabebuia. E. actinophylla has 5 fertile stamens, a trait not seen in Tabebuia.

Evolution
The evolution of Ekmanianthe is in some ways parallel to that of the Asian tribe Oroxyleae. The bat-pollinated Oroxylum has actinomorphic flowers with five fertile stamens. The hawkmoth-pollinated Nyctocalos has elongate flowers and most of the species have only four fertile stamens.

History
Both species of Ekmanianthe were originally described in 1866 by August Grisebach, who placed them in the genus Tecoma. In 1915, Nathaniel Lord Britton placed them in Tabebuia. In 1924, Ignatz Urban, recognizing their distinctiveness, erected the new genus Ekmanianthe in the journal now known as Feddes Repertorium, which was at that time edited by Friedrich Karl Georg Fedde. ''Ekmanianthe was named for the Swedish botanist Erik Leonard Ekman (1883-1931)."Anthe" is derived from a Greek word for "flower".

References

External links
 Ekmanianthe, Index Nominum Genericorum
 Ekmanianthe, IPNI
 page 194, Catalogus plantarum cubensium
 "Sertum Antillanum", Wiley Online Library
 CRC World Dictionary of Plant Names: D-L

Bignoniaceae
Bignoniaceae genera